David Oberhauser (born 29 November 1990) is a French professional footballer who plays as a goalkeeper for Championnat National 2 club Boulogne. He is of German descent.

Club career
On 30 August 2021, he returned to Metz on a two-year contract. On 29 August 2022, Oberhauser moved to Boulogne.

References

External links

1989 births
Living people
French people of German descent
French footballers
Association football goalkeepers
Ligue 1 players
Ligue 2 players
Championnat National players
Championnat National 2 players
Championnat National 3 players
Liga II players
AC Ajaccio players
FC UTA Arad players
FC Metz players
Platanias F.C. players
Gazélec Ajaccio players
Red Star F.C. players
Le Puy Foot 43 Auvergne players
US Boulogne players
French expatriate footballers
Expatriate footballers in Romania